Alcantarea burle-marxii is a species in the genus Alcantarea. This species is endemic to Brazil.

References

burle-marxii
Flora of Brazil